Angiari is a comune (municipality) in the Province of Verona in the Italian region Veneto, located about  southwest of Venice and about  southeast of Verona.

Angiari borders the following municipalities: Bonavigo, Cerea, Legnago, Roverchiara, and San Pietro di Morubio.

Demographic evolution

References

Cities and towns in Veneto
Articles which contain graphical timelines